Foster & Lloyd is the debut studio album by the American country music duo of the same name. Commercially, It was their most successful album producing three top-ten singles, "Crazy Over You" (#4), "Sure Thing" (#8), and "What Do You Want from Me This Time?" (#6). The other single, "Texas in 1880", peaked at #18 on the Hot Country Songs chart. The album itself peaked at #33 on the Billboard Top Country Albums chart.

"Crazy Over You", while written by Foster & Lloyd, was first recorded by Ricky Van Shelton and released a month earlier on his debut album, Wild-Eyed Dream. His version was not released as a single.

Track listing

Chart performance

Album

Singles

Personnel
As listed in liner notes.

Foster & Lloyd
Radney Foster - lead vocals, background vocals, guitar
Bill Lloyd - lead vocals, harmony vocals, guitar, mandolin

Musicians
Bruce Bouton - pedal steel guitar, lap steel guitar
John Cowan - harmony vocals (track 9)
Vince Gill - electric guitar (track 3)
Ed Seay - harmony vocals (track 7), engineer
Tommy Wells - drums
Glenn Worf - bass guitar

Sources

1987 debut albums
Foster & Lloyd albums
RCA Records albums